Grèges is a commune in the Seine-Maritime department in the Normandy region in northern France.

Geography

Heraldry

Population

Places of interest
 The church of St.Madeleine, dating from the sixteenth century.
 The ruins of a 15th-century presbytery.

See also
Communes of the Seine-Maritime department

References

Communes of Seine-Maritime